Tomislav Steinbrückner (born 17 October 1966) is a Croatian-German former football player and current head coach of Malaysian side Terengganu.

Playing career
As a football player, Steinbrückner played for several Croatian clubs (Osijek, Marsonia, Belišće, Uljanik, Istra, and Cibalia) before ending his football career in Singapore with Singapore Armed Forces FC.

Managerial career
As head coach, he holds the head coach job for Osijek in two stints as well as coaching NK Novigrad and a short stint with NK Belišće. From December 2014 to November 2015, Steinbrückner was the head coach of Malaysian side T-Team. After a few seasons he went back to Croatia to coach the Osijek Reserves and took the helm at Bijelo Brdo, where he resigned in December 2021. He was announced as a new head coach for Terengganu FC on 1 December 2022 for 2023 season.

References

External links
 

1966 births
Living people
People from Osijek-Baranja County
Association football midfielders
Yugoslav footballers
Croatian footballers
NK Osijek players
NK Belišće players
NK Marsonia players
NK Istra players
HNK Cibalia players
Yugoslav First League players
Croatian Football League players
Croatian expatriate footballers
Expatriate footballers in Singapore
Croatian expatriate sportspeople in Singapore
 Croatian people of German descent
 German people of Croatian descent
Croatian football managers
NK Osijek managers
NK Belišće managers
Croatian Football League managers